The Cypriot national under-19 football team is the national under-19 football team of Cyprus controlled by Cyprus Football Association.

Results and fixtures

2022 UEFA European Under-19 Championship

Qualifiers

Qualifying Round – Group 4

Current squad
 The following players were called up for the 2023 UEFA European Under-19 Championship qualification matches.
 Match dates: 17, 20 and 23 November 2022
 Caps and goals correct as of:''' 26 September 2022, after the match against

See also
 Cyprus national football team
 Cyprus national under-21 football team
 Cyprus national under-17 football team
 European Under-19 Football Championship

References

External links
 CFA.COM.CY U19 - Cyprus Football Association Official Page
 UEFA.COM - Cyprus U19 National Team

European national under-19 association football teams
under-19